In mathematics, a hyperbolic link is a link in the 3-sphere with complement that has a complete Riemannian metric of constant negative curvature, i.e. has a hyperbolic geometry. A hyperbolic knot is a hyperbolic link with one component.

As a consequence of the work of William Thurston, it is known that every knot is precisely one of the following: hyperbolic, a torus knot, or a satellite knot. As a consequence, hyperbolic knots can be considered plentiful. A similar heuristic applies to hyperbolic links. 

As a consequence of Thurston's hyperbolic Dehn surgery theorem, performing Dehn surgeries on a hyperbolic link enables one to obtain many more hyperbolic 3-manifolds.

Examples

Borromean rings are hyperbolic.
Every non-split, prime, alternating link that is not a torus link is hyperbolic by a result of William Menasco.
41 knot (the figure-eight knot)
52 knot (the three-twist knot)
61 knot (the stevedore knot)
62 knot
63 knot
74 knot
10 161 knot (the "Perko pair" knot)
12n242 knot

See also
 SnapPea
 Hyperbolic volume (knot)

Further reading
 Colin Adams (1994, 2004) The Knot Book, American Mathematical Society, .
 William Menasco (1984) "Closed incompressible surfaces in alternating knot and link complements", Topology 23(1):37–44.
 William Thurston (1978-1981) The geometry and topology of three-manifolds, Princeton lecture notes.

External links
Colin Adams, Handbook of Knot Theory

 
3-manifolds